Hylands House is a Grade II* neo-classical villa situated within Hylands Park a 232-hectare (574 acre) park southwest of Chelmsford in Essex in South East England. It is owned and operated by Chelmsford City Council.

History
The last private owner lived in Hylands House until her death in 1962. It was in 1966, with the house in a desperate state of disrepair, that Chelmsford Borough Council purchased the Park for the people of Chelmsford to enjoy. Hylands Park was opened to the public only 10 days later. It was agreed by Chelmsford Borough Council that Hylands House should be restored to its former glory and having stood empty for 20 years, the first phase of restoration took place in 1986. The final stage was completed in September 2005.

Past owners of Hylands House

Sir John Comyns 1730–1740 
Around 1726, a local and well-respected lawyer, Sir John Comyns, purchased the manor of Shaxstones in Writtle, and commissioned the construction of a new family home on the estate, suitable for a man of his standing. Completed in 1730, Hylands House was an elegant two-storey red brick building in Queen Anne style architecture. The grounds were set out in the formal geometric style fashionable at the time, with a pleasure garden and small kitchen garden to the north of the house.

John Comyns 1740–1760 & John Richard Comyns 1760–1797 
Sir John Comyns died in 1740, without surviving children, and left the estate to his nephew, John Comyns of Romford. In 1759, John Comyns commissioned a monument to the life of his beloved uncle, which can be seen at the family vault in Writtle Church. John in turn left Hylands to his son, John Richard Comyns in 1760.

Cornelius Kortright 1797–1814 
In 1797 Cornelius Kortright purchased Hylands House and employed the well-known landscape architect Humphry Repton, who set about redesigning the gardens. Kortright planned to add the east and west wings, a colonnaded portico and cover the whole house in white stucco. Kortright purchased an additional 150 acres of land to accommodate the scheme and by 1814 the changes made to the estate were extensive. However, despite the grand plans, Kortright did not see the House through to completion as his ever-increasing family required them to relocate to a much larger residence, in nearby Fryerning.

Pierre Cesar Labouchere 1814–1839 
Pierre Cesar Labouchere, a Dutch-born merchant banker, purchased the estate in 1814 and set about completing Repton's design for expansion and improvement of the house and parkland. This resulted in the symmetrical neo-classic facade that can be seen today. Labouchere created the formal Pleasure Gardens and under the guidance of architect Williams Atkinson, the Georgian Stable Block and Coachman's Cottage. He also collected neo-classical sculptures, including works by the Danish sculptor Bertel Thorvaldsen, replicas of which are on display in the house today.

John Attwood 1839–1858 
After Labouchère's death, his son Henry Labouchere sold Hylands House and Estate to Mr John Attwood, former owner of an ironworks in Birmingham. Attwood was an ambitious entrepreneur who wanted a property to befit his new status and promote his quest for a peerage. As MP for Harwich, he decided that Hylands was insufficiently grand to reflect his position in society, and had the house considerably enlarged and fully redecorated.

Attwood eventually ran into financial difficulties incurring debts of £300,000. Consequently they were forced to sell the house and estate. They later moved to France where they died a pauper.

Arthur Pryor 1858–1904 
Arthur Pryor was a partner in the Truman, Hanbury and Buxton Brewery and purchased a much reduced Hylands Estate in 1858. He did little to the house other than some redecoration, although some of the exuberant decoration in the Banqueting Room is credited to him. Pryor's eldest son inherited the estate but chose to rent out rather than live there himself.

Sir Daniel Gooch 1904–1920 
Having originally rented the House and land in 1904, Sir Daniel Gooch purchased Hylands in 1907, and modernised the House, with the installation of electricity and telephones. The Gooch family entertained regularly, with shooting parties and fetes, including a memorable celebration for the coronation of King George V. During World War I, Hylands House was requisitioned for use as a military hospital, and over 1,500 patients were treated there. Sir Daniel was also a keen explorer and accompanied Sir Ernest Shackleton on the first leg of his bid to reach the South Pole, but returned home early, suffering from severe frostbite.

Mr John and Christine Hanbury 1922–1962 
In 1920, Hylands was sold to a syndicate of local gentlemen, but only two years later it was purchased by John Hanbury. Like Arthur Pryor, John was chairman of the brewers Truman's. However, John Hanbury died suddenly in 1923 before taking occupation of Hylands. Christine was later left alone when her son, Charles John MacKenzie (Jock) Hanbury,  became one of the first pilots to die in the Second World War in a flying accident. Christine Hanbury made great changes to the grounds, including a lawn tennis court, rhododendron borders and a private area in the gardens dedicated to the memory of her husband and son. During World War II, the estate was the site for a German Prisoner of War Camp, and the house was used by the SAS as their headquarters.

Mrs Christine Hanbury died in 1962, aged 89, leaving the house and estate to her trustees, and for the final time in its history, Hylands was again offered for sale. Chelmsford Borough Council purchased the house and estate at auction in 1966 and set about opening it to the public and eventually restoring both the House and the grounds. However, the house was in a dilapidated condition at the time of the purchase and by 1971 the servants quarters had been demolished. A motion to knock down the entire house was narrowly defeated by 15 votes to 9.

Restoration of the House
The House was in a state of progressive deterioration but, despite its poor condition, in 1967 Hylands House became a Grade II listed building. In 1985 the Borough Council set up a restoration fund and later that year English Heritage gave their consent to the Council's proposal to reduce the house to its 19th-century appearance. Prior to work commencing Hylands House was re-graded to become a Grade II* listed building.

As a result of the collaboration of the Director of Leisure Services, Malcolm Gilham and the Borough Architect, Esmond Abraham, phased restoration work began in 1986, and by 1996 the external work to the House had been completed and the Entrance Hall restored to its Georgian grandeur. The Blue Room and Boudoir were refurbished and once again the house was full of the sound of people. The Friends of Hylands House was formed and they have undertaken fundraising to assist with the furnishing of the House.

In 1998 planning began to celebrate the opening of the East Wing. The Manager, Linda Pittom (then Palmer) and her team, worked to ensure that not only the 'VIP 'official opening, the celebrations for those working on the project and the very first Wedding Ceremony at Hylands, and the celebrations of the public open days were a success. The east wing was fully restored and opened to the general public at Easter 1999. The west wing and basement restoration quickly followed and their grand opening took place at Easter 2004 - the Manager and her team in conjunction with the Special Events Team at Chelmsford Borough Council provided a comprehensive, exciting and entertaining programme of events. The restoration of the basement area has brought to life the original red brick Queen Anne house and a number of exciting discoveries were made. Interpretation boards throughout the house offer visitors an informative and photographic display of the restoration process.

The final phase of restoration in the House was completed in September 2005, supported by the Heritage Lottery Fund. Hylands House is now fully restored to its Victorian splendour.

Restoration of the Estate

Intensive work on restoring the historic landscape of Hylands Park to its 18th-century splendour, designed by landscape architect Humphry Repton, began in 2004 and was completed in 2007. The restoration of Hylands Park was financed by a Heritage Lottery Fund grant of £3.4 million and by the Council.

Recent history
From 1996 until 2017, the park hosted the annual V Festival. In 2018 it became RiZE Festival.

In the 2004 film Chasing Liberty, Hylands House doubled as the US White House. In 2005 Hylands Park was the venue for the European Scout Jamboree and in 2007 Hylands welcomed scouts from over 160 nations for the 21st World Scout Jamboree, which celebrated 100 years of scouting. The One World Garden was created to commemorate this historic event, and now forms part of the estate.

In 2019, the Netflix series The Crown Season 3, Hylands House was again used as a double for the White House.
 
The Stables section of the house is now a lively Arts Quarter. There you can find Artists and designers making high-end quality work.

References

External links

Hylands Park official site
Friends of Hylands House

Country houses in Essex
Grade II* listed buildings in Essex
Grade II* listed houses
Neoclassical architecture in England
Gardens in Essex
Historic house museums in Essex
Buildings and structures in Chelmsford (city)
Country parks in Essex
Grade II* listed parks and gardens in Essex